is a former Japanese football player.

Playing career
Nakajima was born in Chiba Prefecture on February 9, 1984. After graduating from high school, he joined J2 League club Shonan Bellmare in 2002. He played many matches as left side back. Although he could hardly play in the match from summer 2002. In 2004, he moved to J2 club Yokohama FC. He became a regular left side back. Although the club results were sluggish every season, Yokohama won the champions in 2006 season and was promoted to J1 League first time in the club history. Although he played many matches, Yokohama finished at the bottom place in 2007 season and was relegated to J2 in a year. In 2008, he moved to J2 club Avispa Fukuoka. He played many matches in 3 seasons and Avispa was promoted to J1 end of 2010 season. In 2011, he moved to J1 club Kashiwa Reysol. However he could hardly play in the match. In August 2012, he moved to Yokohama FC for the first time in 5 years. He played many matches as left side back until 2015. In 2016, he moved to J3 League club Gainare Tottori. He retired end of 2016 season.

Club statistics

Honors

Kashiwa Reysol
J1 League (1): 2011
Japanese Super Cup (1): 2012

Yokohama FC
J2 League (1): 2006

References

External links

1984 births
Living people
Association football people from Chiba Prefecture
Japanese footballers
J1 League players
J2 League players
J3 League players
Shonan Bellmare players
Yokohama FC players
Avispa Fukuoka players
Kashiwa Reysol players
Gainare Tottori players
Association football defenders